"Lucky" is a song by the English rock band Radiohead, first released on The Help Album, a 1995 charity compilation organised by the charity War Child. "Lucky" was recorded in five hours with the producer Nigel Godrich. Radiohead included it on their third studio album, OK Computer (1997), and released it as a single in France in December 1997.

Recording
In 1995, Radiohead were on tour, promoting their second album, The Bends. During soundchecks for shows in Japan, guitarist Ed O'Brien produced a high-pitched sound by strumming above the guitar nut. The band developed the sound into a song, "Lucky", which became part of the set list.

Around this time, the producer Brian Eno asked Radiohead to contribute a song to The Help Album, a charity compilation organised by the charity War Child. The album was to be recorded in a single day, 4 September 1995, and rush-released that week. Radiohead recorded "Lucky" in five hours with engineer Nigel Godrich, who had assisted producer John Leckie with The Bends and produced several Radiohead B-sides. Godrich went on to produce their third album, OK Computer. He said of the Help Album session: "Those things are the most inspiring, when you do stuff really fast and there's nothing to lose. We left feeling fairly euphoric."

Yorke later said "Lucky" shaped the nascent sound and mood of OK Computer. He said: "'Lucky' was indicative of what we wanted to do. It was like the first mark on the wall."

Release
To promote The Help Album, "Lucky" featured as the lead track on the Help EP, which charted at number 51 after BBC Radio 1 chose not to play it. It was included as the 11th track on Radiohead's album OK Computer.

Track listing

Personnel
Radiohead
 Colin Greenwood
 Jonny Greenwood
 Ed O'Brien
 Philip Selway
 Thom Yorke

Additional personnel
 Stanley Donwood – illustrations
 Nigel Godrich – production, engineering

Charts

References

Bibliography

 
 

1995 songs
1997 singles
Radiohead songs
Songs written by Thom Yorke
Songs written by Jonny Greenwood
Songs written by Ed O'Brien
Songs written by Colin Greenwood
Songs written by Philip Selway
Song recordings produced by Nigel Godrich
Parlophone singles